Kampi Ya Samaki is a settlement in Kenya's Baringo County, located on the shore of Lake Baringo.
The name  Ya Samaki is Swahili for 'fish camp'.  Kampi ya  is a landing bay for fishermen and also provides a market for their fish. The population of Kampi Ya Samaki are primarily from the Arror subtribe of the Tugen.

References 

Populated places in Baringo County